Rhododendron smirnowii, the Smirnow rhododendron, is a species of flowering plant in the family Ericaceae, native to northeast Turkey and the western Transcaucasus. Its cultivar 'Vodka' gained the Royal Horticultural Society's Award of Merit in 1991.

References

smirnowii
Flora of Turkey
Flora of the Transcaucasus
Plants described in 1885